Shapoorji Pallonji & Company Private Limited, trading as Shapoorji Pallonji Group, is an Indian conglomerate, headquartered in Mumbai. It operates in construction, real estate, textiles, engineered goods, home appliances, shipping, publications, power, and biotechnology. The company was headed by a grandson of founder Pallonji Mistry, also named Pallonji Mistry, until 2012, when he announced his retirement and the succession of his son, Shapoor Mistry.

Shapoorji Pallonji is regarded as "one of India's most valuable private enterprises." The US$2.5 billion Shapoorji Pallonji Group have two listed companies, Forbes & Company Ltd. and Gokak Textiles. Forbes was already listed when bought by Shapoorji Pallonji, though there was speculation in 2006 that group company Afcons Infrastructure would go public via an IPO.

The company is known for building some of Mumbai's landmarks around the Fort area, including the Hong Kong Bank, Grindlays Bank, Standard Chartered Bank and Reserve Bank of India building, Bombay Stock Exchange building and Taj Intercontinental. Apart from these, the company has built a stone palace for the Sultan of Oman in 1971.  After the 2008 Mumbai Attacks, the company was involved in the repairs and renovation of Taj Mahal Palace & Tower which was severely damaged by the attack. Other notable projects include The Imperial in Mumbai, Jumeirah Lake Towers in Dubai and Ebene Cyber City in Mauritius.

In 2012, Shapoor Mistry announced that the Group had plans to invest in a deep-sea port, an IT park, hydro electricity and construction of roads and night shelters for the poor in West Bengal.
In
January 2016, Shapoorji Pallonji Group launched its first affordable housing brand, Joyville Homes.

History 
The company was founded as a partnership firm Littlewood Pallonji, in 1865.  The first project was the construction of a pavement on the Girgaum Chowpatty, followed by being part of the construction of a reservoir on Malabar Hill which supplied water to Mumbai for over 100 years. The company also built the Brabourne stadium in Mumbai and the Jawaharlal Nehru stadium in Delhi. The Mumbai Central Railway station, was also built by them at a cost of 1.6 crore. The company was commended by the then Governor of Bombay for completing the work within 21 months. In recent years, it has built the Barakhamba Underground Station in Delhi and Providence Stadium in Guyana. In 2010, it built India's tallest building of the time, The Imperial, a residential tower in Mumbai.

The Shapoorji Pallonji has also had a brief involvement with Bollywood. Released in 1960, K. Asif's magnum opus, and one of the most popular and critically acclaimed Bollywood films of all time, Mughal-e-Azam, was funded by the group with a budget of  1.5 crore, which made it the most expensive Bollywood film till then and a record it held for many years. More than four decades later, the group funded a digital remastering of the film at a budget of 5 crore, which was released on 12 November 2004. Shapoor Mistry, grandson of Shapoorji Pallonji Mistry, thought it a fitting tribute to complete his grandfather's unfinished dream of colourising the film, especially as the original was produced by his grandfather. In 2016, Shapoorji Pallonji Group, in association with the National Centre for the Performing Arts (India), co-produced Mughal-e-Azam, a Broadway-style musical directed by Feroz Abbas Khan, and based on the 1960 Bollywood film Mughal-e-Azam.

Acquisitions 
In 1936, Shapoorji Pallonji bought F.E. Dinshaw and Co. after the death of its promoter. F.E. Dinshaw and Co. was an established finance firm that had high-profile dealings such as arranging a loan from the Maharaja of Gwalior for Tata Steel (then TISCO) in 1924 and merging local cement companies to form ACC Cement in 1936. F.E. Dinshaw and Co. also had a 12.5% stake in Tata Sons, which came to Shapoorji Pallonji.

In 2001-02, Shapoorji Pallonji took over Forbes Gokak (now Forbes and Company) from the Tata group after winning a takeover battle with the Pawankumar Sanwarmal Group. The company was already listed on the BSE when it was taken over and remains the group's only listed entity as of 2011.

In 2012, Shapoorji Pallonji was planning to build a deepwater port in Gujarat.

See also 
 Afcons Infrastructure
 Statue of Belief
 Tata Group

References 

Companies based in Mumbai
Indian companies established in 1865
Companies based in Bangalore
Shapoorji Pallonji Group
Conglomerate companies established in 1865